{{Infobox organization
|name           = The Magic Circle
|image          = Magischer Zirkel der DDR logo.svg
|image_border   = 
|size           = 300px
|alt            = Second logo of the Magischer Zirkel der DDR, adopted January 1969
|caption        = Second logo of the Magischer Zirkel der DDR, adopted January 1969
|map            = 
|msize          = 
|malt           = 
|mcaption       = 
|abbreviation   = 
|motto          = 
|formation      =  (original founding) (refounding)
|dissolved      =  (first dissolution) (merged with the Magischer Zirkel von Deutschland)
|type           = 
|status         = 
|purpose        = 
|headquarters   = 
|coords         = 
|membership     = 
|language       = German
|leader_title   = First Chairman
|leader_name    = 
|main_organ     = 
|parent_organization = 
|affiliations   = 
|num_staff      = 
|num_volunteers = 
|budget         = 
|website        = https://www.mzvd.de/
|remarks        = 
}}
The Magischer Zirkel der Deutschen Demokratischen Republik (Magic Circle of the German Democratic Republic) was a national magicians' association that was active in East Germany from 1956 to 1969, and again briefly in 1990. It continues to maintain an active website.

 History 

The organization was founded on 20 October 1956 following a meeting between Theo Bozenhard, Hans Marian, Hans Hander (Tosari), Hans-Gerhard Stumpf, and GDR Culture Minister Johannes R. Becher.  Erich Kluge served as the organization's first chairman until January 1959, when he stepped down for reasons of ill health.  Hans Hander took over as interim leader, becoming first chairman on 12 January 1962 upon Kluge's death.  Siegfried Nitsche then served as first chairman from Hander's death in January 1968 until the organization was dissolved in December 1969.

Following the group's dissolution, magicians' associations in East Germany were confined to the local level.  In 1974 there were forty such associations, with a total membership of around 600.  By 1990 the number of associations had risen to 52.

On 11 November 1989, ten magicians convened in Leipzig and made an application to the Ministry of Culture to revive the Magischer Zirkel der DDR.  Among the refounders were Hans-Georg Bucsi, Klaus Fürst, Hans-Gerhard Stumpf, and Annette Kirberg-Stumpf.  The association was officially re-established on 6 January 1990.  At its first conference on 10 March of that year, Hans-Gerhard Stumpf was elected president.  Within a few months, Stumpf and the managing directors of the association met with their West German counterparts in the Magischer Zirkel von Deutschland to discuss unification of the two groups.  The merger was effected on 29 September 1990.

 References 

 Further reading 
 Rudiger Deutsch.  Die Kunst des Verzauberns: 100 Jahre Magischer Zirkel Hamburg.''  Hamburg Magischer Zirkel, 2012.  .

Defunct clubs and societies of East Germany
Magic organizations
Arts organizations established in 1956
Arts organizations established in 1990
1956 establishments in East Germany
1969 disestablishments in East Germany
1990 establishments in East Germany
1990 disestablishments in East Germany
East German culture